Talmadge Robert "Tal" "Sheriff" Maples (December 1, 1910 – April 19, 1975) was an American football player and once assistant Postmaster General of the United States. Maples was a prominent center for the Tennessee Volunteers, captain of the 1933 team.

References

External links

1910 births
Tennessee Volunteers football players
American football centers
Players of American football from Knoxville, Tennessee
1975 deaths
Cincinnati Reds (NFL) players